Ann Kathryn Turkel (born July 16, 1946) is an American actress and former model. Turkel studied acting at the Musical Theatre Academy.

Life and career

Turkel was born in New York City to a Jewish family. She was photographed for American Vogue in the late 1960s. Patrick Lichfield captured images of her on location in the United Kingdom, the Bahamas, and Italy during the early 1970s, and included them in his 1981 book The Most Beautiful Women.

After a brief appearance in the film Paper Lion (1968), her first major role was in the 1974 film, 99 and 44/100% Dead starring her future husband Richard Harris, and they acted together in The Cassandra Crossing (1976), Golden Rendezvous (1977) and Ravagers (1979).

Turkel and Harris married in 1974 in Beverly Hills. They were divorced in 1982. Despite their divorce she and Harris remained good friends.

She portrayed comic strip heroine Modesty Blaise in a 1982 TV pilot.

Her other movie roles included Portrait of a Hitman (1979), with Jack Palance, and Humanoids from the Deep (1980), Deep Space (1988) and The Fear (1995). She also played the role of modeling agent and immortal Kristen in "Chivalry," a season four episode of Highlander: The Series.

Filmography

Television

References

External links
 
 

1946 births
Living people
Actresses from New York City
Female models from New York (state)
American film actresses
American television actresses
Jewish American actresses
21st-century American Jews
21st-century American women